Lars Vågberg (born 30 June 1967 in Sollefteå, Sweden) is a Norwegian curler from Bærum.

Vågberg began his international curling career in Sweden. In his first international tournament, he was the second Mikael Hasselborg's 1990 European Curling Championships winning team. With Hasselborg, he would finish 7th at the World Curling Championships in 1992 and a bronze medal at the 1994 European Championships.

By 1997 Vågberg had moved to Norway. The 1997 World Championships would be the first for Vågberg as a Norwegian, and he played third for Pål Trulsen. While they finished 7th that year, the team would later go on to win two bronze medals (2001, 2003) and a silver (2002) at the Worlds. Most notably however was their victory at the 2002 Winter Olympics when they defeated Canadas' Kevin Martin in the gold medal final. The team added to their success with their first gold medal at the European Championships in 2005.

In 2010 (and before), Lars work at Belset Skole in Bærum, as physical education teacher and advisor.

In 1995 he was inducted into the Swedish Curling Hall of Fame.

External links
 
 http://sports123.com/cur/mw.html
 https://web.archive.org/web/20100820043301/http://www.curling.se/CurlHome/Statistik/SM/SmLagHerrar.asp

1967 births
Living people
Olympic curlers of Norway
Curlers at the 2002 Winter Olympics
Curlers at the 2006 Winter Olympics
Olympic gold medalists for Norway
Norwegian male curlers
Swedish male curlers
Swedish curling champions
Swedish emigrants to Norway
Olympic medalists in curling
Medalists at the 2002 Winter Olympics
Continental Cup of Curling participants
European curling champions